Aprelevka Record Plant (Russian: Апрелевский завод грампластинок) was a company that manufactured phonograph records. It was located in Aprelevka, Moscow Oblast.

History
In the first year of operation (1911), 400,000 phonograph records under the brand name Metropol Record were released. After the 1917 October Revolution, the plant was nationalized and began producing records with performances by Russian revolutionaries. In 1925, the plant was renamed to "Aprelevka Plant in the name of Memory of Year 1905" (Russian: Апрелевский завод памяти 1905 года).

In the early 1930s, the plant became the main producer of phonograph records in the USSR. The plant was expanded, it employed more than 1000 workers, and the annual release reached 19 million records. In the early days of World War II, the “Holy War” performed by the Alexandrov ensemble was first recorded at the plant. During the war, the plant produced aerial bombs. After the war, in 1952, the factory mastered the production of long-playing records. And in 1961, the production of the first stereo records began.

In 1964, the Aprelevka Plant became part of the All-Union record company “Melodiya” as the main production enterprise, which subsequently produced up to 65% of all Soviet records. By the early 1980s, the plant employed more than 3,000 people, and the release of records exceeded 50 million pieces per year. In 1989, the factory began production of audio cassettes. After 1991, the structure of “Melodiya” (primarily the centralized system of orders and sales) began to fall apart, and the record plants included in it received unexpected and, as it turned out, burdensome freedom.

Demand for vinyl records began to decline sharply: the purchasing power of the population fell, the production of turntables decreased, and new optical audio format, CD, entered the market. In 1991, when the Aprelevka Plant released about 33 million records, it was already operating at a loss, since the prices of the records remained fixed. Neither the transition to independent customers (SNC Records, Moroz Records and other record companies), nor the release of cassettes with recordings helped. In 1992, the plant was on the verge of stopping with an annual output of about 10 million pieces. The last batch of records and cassettes was released in 1997. In 2002, the decision of the Moscow Region Arbitration Court, the Aprelevka gramophone record plant was declared bankrupt.

The president of the Russian independent label Lilith Records, Olga Kiryanova, said that the Aprelevka vinyl record factory will start working again in the spring of 2009, but these plans were not destined to come true.

Awards
 Medal of Lenin (April 19, 1971)

Nowadays
Nowadays, other companies are working on the territory of the Aprelevka Plant.

In August 2014, information appeared in the mass media that in Aprelevka it was planned to reconstruct the territory of the Melodiya phonograph record plant. Instead of the closed territory of the industrial zone, it is planned to build a city square and a main street with a shopping arcade, set up a park, organize a cultural center, a record museum and a mini-hotel with 100 seats. There will also fit an industrial park with offices and mini-manufactures.

References

Companies based in Moscow Oblast
1910 establishments in the Russian Empire
2002 disestablishments in Russia
Manufacturing companies established in 1910
Manufacturing companies disestablished in 2002
Defunct companies of Russia
Manufacturing companies of Russia
Audio equipment manufacturers of Russia
Phonograph manufacturers
Companies nationalised by the Soviet Union
Manufacturing companies of the Soviet Union